Eight referendums were held in Switzerland in 1973. The first two were held on 4 March on amendments to the Swiss Federal Constitution on education and promoting research. Whilst the education proposal was approved by a majority of voters, it failed to receive the support of a majority of cantons. The research proposal was approved by both. The third referendum was held on 20 May on another constitutional amendment, removing articles 51 and 52 regarding Jesuits and cloisters, and was approved.

The final five referendums were held on 2 December on price controls, the credit system, measures to stabilise the construction market, a reversal of the income tax write-off and a constitutional amendment regarding the protection of animals, all of which were approved.

Results

4 March: Constitutional amendment on education

4 March: Constitutional amendment on promoting research

20 May: Constitutional amendment on Jesuits and cloisters

2 December: Price controls

2 December: Credit system

2 December: Construction market

2 December: Income tax write-off

2 December: Constitutional amendment on animal protection

References

External links
Répertoire chronologique des objets acceptés Swiss Federal Chancellery

1973 referendums
1973 in Switzerland
Referendums in Switzerland